Oscar De Wolf Randolph (September 28, 1884 – December 31, 1964) was an American football player and coach and Episcopal minister. Randolph Hall at Virginia Episcopal School was named in his honor. One description of his personality was that of a "cold fish". He was the son of Isham Randolph, and a descendant of Sir John Randolph.

Randolph played quarterback for the Virginia Cavaliers of the University of Virginia. He was a protege of then Virginia quarterback John Pollard, and "one of the fastest quarters Virginia has ever had." In 1906, Randolph was selected for the All-Southern team published in The Washington Post. He was a teammate of Billy Gloth.

After UVA, Randolph entered the Virginia Theological Seminary and helped coach the Episcopal High School football team. He helped coach the backfields of Virginia and VMI in later years.

He was the rector of Robert E. Lee Memorial Episcopal Church  in Lexington, and conducted the funeral of Lee's son.

References

External links

American football officials
American football quarterbacks
Virginia Cavaliers football coaches
Virginia Cavaliers football players
VMI Keydets football coaches
All-Southern college football players
1884 births
1964 deaths
Sportspeople from Chicago
Players of American football from Chicago
American Episcopal priests
20th-century American Episcopalians